Wang Fan (228–266), courtesy name Yongyuan, was a Chinese astronomer, mathematician, politician, and writer of the state of Eastern Wu during the Three Kingdoms period of China.

Life
Wang Fan was from Lujiang Commandery, which is located southwest of present-day Lujiang County, Anhui. He started his career in Wu as a Gentleman of Writing during the reign of the first Wu emperor Sun Quan or second Wu emperor Sun Liang, but was dismissed from office.

During the reign of the third Wu emperor Sun Xiu, Wang Fan served as a Central Regular Mounted Attendant alongside He Shao, Xue Ying and Yu Si, and was given an additional appointment as a Chief Commandant of Escorting Cavalry. He received much praise from his contemporaries. When the Wu government sent him as an ambassador to Wu's ally state, Shu, he was also highly regarded by the Shu government. Upon returning to Wu, he served as a military supervisor at the Wu military garrison in Xiakou.

During the reign of the fourth and last Wu emperor Sun Hao, Wang Fan became a Regular Attendant alongside Wan Yu. Although he was initially close to Sun Hao, he gradually became alienated from the emperor as other officials slandered him in front of the emperor and as he became more outspoken against the emperor's outrageous behaviour. In 266, he offended Sun Hao and ended up losing his head. Sun Hao also exiled his family to the remote Guang Province in the south. Lu Kai, the Imperial Chancellor of Wu during Sun Hao's reign, lamented Wang Fan's unfortunate end.

Wang Fan had two brothers, Wang Zhu and Wang Yan, who were also well-known learned men in Wu. Both of them were killed during a rebellion started by Guo Ma in 279, which was one of the events leading to the fall of Wu in 280.

Contributions to mathematics and astronomy
Wang Fan was proficient in mathematics and astronomy. He calculated the distance from the Sun to the Earth, but his geometric model was not correct. In addition, he gave the numerical value of π as 142 / 45 = 3.155…, which was not as accurate as that given by the mathematician Liu Hui, who lived around the same time as him.

See also
 Lists of people of the Three Kingdoms

References

 Chen, Shou (3rd century). Records of the Three Kingdoms (Sanguozhi).
 Pei, Songzhi (5th century). Annotations to Records of the Three Kingdoms (Sanguozhi zhu).
 .
 .

228 births
266 deaths
3rd-century executions
3rd-century Chinese mathematicians
3rd-century Chinese astronomers
Ancient Chinese mathematicians
Eastern Wu politicians
Eastern Wu writers
Executed Eastern Wu people
Executed people from Anhui
Executed Three Kingdoms people
Mathematicians from Anhui
People executed by a Three Kingdoms state by decapitation
People executed by Eastern Wu
Politicians from Hefei
Writers from Anhui